A Tepak Sireh is a traditional Malay metal container for storing betel leaves used for chewing.

External links

Malay cuisine
Food storage containers